This article lists diplomatic missions resident in Maldives.  The capital, Malé, hosts 9 embassies/high commissions. Several other countries have accredited ambassadors resident in other capitals or major cities in the region. Honorary consulates are omitted from this listing.

Embassies and High Commissions in Malé

Consulate-General in Malé

Notes

References

 Diplomatic & Consular Corps | Ministry of Foreign Affairs of Maldives

 
Maldives
Diplomatic missions